EOB may refer to:

Ed O'Brien (b. 1968), English guitarist and member of Radiohead who releases solo music as EOB
Eastern / Greek Orthodox Bible, an English-language Bible edition
 End of business
 Explanation of benefits
 Enemy Order of battle
 Electronic order of battle, a concept in intelligence management
 End of Block character, a character to terminate a transmission block